Bis(triethoxysilylpropyl)tetrasulfide is an organosulfur compound with the formula S4[C3H6Si(OEt)3]2 (Et = C2H5).  The molecule consists of two trialkoxysilyl propyl groups linked with a polysulfide.  It is often sold as a mixture with the trisulfide.  The compound is a colorless viscous liquid that is soluble in ordinary organic solvents such as toluene.  Commercial samples often are yellowish.  The compound is added to rubber compositions that contain silica filler.

Synthesis and reactivity
The compound was first prepared by the reaction of 3-(triethoxysilyl)propyl chloride with sodium tetrasulfide:
Na2S4  +  2 ClC3H6Si(OEt)3  →   S4[C3H6Si(OEt)3]2  +  2 NaCl

Bis(triethoxysilylpropyl)tetrasulfide is a bifunctional molecule in that it contains two kinds of reactive functional groups.  The tetrasulfide group is a polysulfide, which means that it consists of a chain of sulfur atoms.  S-S bonds are susceptible to reduction (to thiols), attachment to metals (e.g., for protection against corrosion), and vulcanization.  The triethoxysilyl groups are susceptible to hydrolysis, resulting in cross-linking via sol-gel condensation.  In the usual application of this chemical, the hydrolyzed siloxy groups attach to silica particles and the polysulfide groups link to the organic polymer.

References

Sulfur compounds
Corrosion inhibitors
Ethoxides
Organosilicon compounds